Biddenham is a civil parish in Bedford, Bedfordshire, England. It contains 23 listed buildings that are recorded in the National Heritage List for England.  Of these, one is listed at Grade I, the highest of the three grades, and the others are at Grade II, the lowest grade. The entire parish consists of a large village, containing small, thatched cottages at the southern end, and large detached, modern houses in the northern end.  Almost all the listed buildings are houses and associated structures, farmhouses, and farm buildings.  Also listed are a church and a public house.

Key

Buildings

References

Lists of listed buildings in Bedfordshire
Listed buildings in the Borough of Bedford